The 55th Grand Bell Awards, also known as Daejong Film Awards, is determined and presented annually by The Motion Pictures Association of Korea for excellence in film in South Korea. The Grand Bell Awards were first presented in 1962 and have gained prestige as the Korean equivalent of the American Academy Awards.

The ceremony was held at the Sejong University Convention Center in Seoul on October 22, 2018, and hosted by Shin Hyun-joon and Kim Gyu-ri.

Nominations and winners
Nominations were announced September 21, 2018.

References

Grand Bell Awards